Frank William Morter (14 August 1897 – 20 December 1958) was an English cricketer. Morter was a right-handed batsman who bowled right-arm medium-fast. He was born at Downe, Kent.

Morter made his first-class debut for Warwickshire against Yorkshire at the Fartown Ground, Huddersefield, in the 1922 County Championship. He made two further first-class appearances for the county in that same season, against Kent at Edgbaston, and Leicestershire at Aylestone Road, Leicester. In his three first-class appearances for the county, he took a total of 3 wickets at an average of 46.00, with best figures of 2/5. With the bat, he scored 13 runs at a batting average of 4.33, with a high score of 8.

He died at Birmingham, Warwickshire, on 20 December 1958.

References

External links
Frank Morter at ESPNcricinfo
Frank Morter at CricketArchive

1897 births
1958 deaths
People from Downe
English cricketers
Warwickshire cricketers